Arch Street, The Greenwich Teen Center is the longest-running, privately funded teen center in the USA. It was established in 1981, and is located in Greenwich, Connecticut. The Executive Director of the teen center is Kyle Silver. Age starts at 12.

Notable alumni
 Evan Ross The American Actor and Musician. Son of Diana Ross.
 Pete Francis Heimbold Attended the Greenwich Teen Center and played his first shows with Dispatch.

References

 Arch Street's About Page

External links
 

Greenwich, Connecticut
Non-profit organizations based in Connecticut